Mühltal is a municipality in the district of Darmstadt-Dieburg, in Hesse, Germany. It is situated southeast of Darmstadt from which it is separated by the Stadtwald (City Forest).

Historically, there have been many watermills on Modau river and its tributaries, giving rise to the name Mühltal ("Mill Valley, Mill Dale"), a district through which the river flows.

Notable people
Karl Ferdinand Abt (1903–1945) -Nazi politician
Johann Konrad Dippel (1673–1734)-theologian and alchemist

References

External links

Darmstadt-Dieburg